Edward Charles Jeffrey (May 21, 1866 – April 19, 1952) was a Canadian-American botanist who worked on vascular plant anatomy and phylogeny.

From 1892 to 1902 Jeffrey was a lecturer at the University of Toronto. While on leave of absence, he received his Ph.D. from Harvard University in 1899. In 1902 he became there an assistant professor of vegetable histology. In 1907 he was promoted to a full professorship of plant morphology. In 1933 he retired from Harvard University as professor emeritus.

In 1906, Jeffrey was elected a member of the American Academy of Arts and Sciences.

Death
E. C. Jeffrey died on 1952-04-19.

Bibliography

References 

1866 births
1952 deaths
20th-century American botanists
20th-century Canadian botanists
Harvard University alumni